Destination Big House is a 1950 American crime film directed by George Blair, written by Eric Taylor and starring Dorothy Patrick, Robert Rockwell, Jimmy Lydon, Robert Armstrong, Larry J. Blake and John Harmon. The film was released on June 1, 1950 by Republic Pictures.

Plot

Cast    
Dorothy Patrick as Janet Brooks
Robert Rockwell as Dr. Walter Phillips
Jimmy Lydon as Freddy Brooks 
Robert Armstrong as Ed Somers
Larry J. Blake as Pete Weiss
John Harmon as Stubby Moore
Claire Du Brey as Celia Brooks
Richard Benedict as Joe Bruno
Mickey Knox as Tony Savoni
Danny Morton as Al Drury 
Mack Williams as Dr. Foster
Olan Soule as Ralph Newell 
Peter Prouse as Ray Olsen
Norman Field as Dr. Evans

References

External links 
 

1950 films
American crime films
1950 crime films
Republic Pictures films
Films directed by George Blair
American black-and-white films
1950s English-language films
1950s American films